Donald Turner may refer to:

 Donald F. Turner (1921–1994), antitrust attorney and professor at Harvard Law School
 Donald H. Turner (born 1964), Republican politician in the Vermont House of Representatives
 Donald Turner (football manager), manager of Partick Thistle F.C., 1929–47
 Don Turner, boxing trainer
 Don Turner (American football) (1930–2007), American football coach